Auvergne (or ) is a former administrative region in central France, comprising the four departments of Allier, Puy-de-Dôme, Cantal and Haute-Loire. Since 1 January 2016, it has been part of the new region Auvergne-Rhône-Alpes.

The administrative region of Auvergne is larger than the historical province of Auvergne, one of the seven counties of Occitania, and includes provinces and areas that historically were not part of Auvergne. The Auvergne region is composed of the following old provinces:

 Auvergne: departments of Puy-de-Dôme, Cantal, northwest of Haute-Loire, and extreme south of Allier. The province of Auvergne is entirely contained inside the Auvergne region
 Bourbonnais: department of Allier. A small part of Bourbonnais lies outside Auvergne, in the neighbouring Centre-Val de Loire region (south of the department of Cher).
 Velay: centre and southeast of department of Haute-Loire. Velay is entirely contained inside the Auvergne region.
 a small part of Gévaudan: extreme southwest of Haute-Loire. Gévaudan is essentially inside the Languedoc-Roussillon region.
 a small part of Vivarais: extreme southeast of Haute-Loire. Vivarais is essentially inside the Rhône-Alpes region.
 a small part of Forez: extreme northeast of Haute-Loire. Forez is essentially inside the Rhône-Alpes region.

Velay, Gévaudan, and Vivarais are often considered to be sub-provinces of the old province of Languedoc. Forez is also often considered to be a sub-province of Lyonnais. Therefore, the modern region of Auvergne is composed of the provinces of Auvergne, major part of Bourbonnais, and parts of Languedoc and Lyonnais.

The region is home to a chain of volcanoes known collectively as the "chaîne des Puys". The last confirmed eruption was around 4040 BCE. The volcanoes began forming some 70,000 years ago, and most have eroded, leaving plugs of hardened magma that form rounded hilltops known as puys.

Geography 

Auvergne is one of the smallest regions in France.

Auvergne is known for its mountain ranges and dormant volcanoes. Together the Monts Dore and the Chaîne des Puys include 80 volcanoes. The Sancy Massif in the Monts Dore is the highest point in Auvergne.

The northern part is covered in hills, while the southern portion is mountainous and dotted with pastures.

Auvergne has two major rivers: the Loire runs through the southeast and borders the northeast, and the Allier runs from north to south down the center of Auvergne, with branches going east and west. Over many years the Allier river has created what are known as the Allier gorges.

Auvergne has about 50 freshwater ponds and lakes. Some are high in the mountains and have volcanic origins. Lac de Guéry is the highest lake in Auvergne.

Auvergne is bordered to the north by the region of Centre-Val de Loire, and by five former administrative regions: Rhône-Alpes to the east, Languedoc-Roussillon and Midi-Pyrénées to the south, Limousin to the west, and Burgundy to the north.

Gallery

Climate

There are long winters and short summers.

History

Land of the Arverni 
The region of Auvergne was named after the Arverni, one of the most powerful Gallic tribes. It was composed of the Gabali, the Vellavi, and the Cadurci, whose sphere of influence included the regions of Languedoc and Aquitaine. Vercingetorix was elected king in 52 BC. His father, Celtillos, his predecessor, had been killed by his companions who opposed Celtillos' goal of making the title hereditary.

In the winter of 53/52 BC, Vercingetorix created alliances with all the Celtic tribes surrounding him by holding as hostages daughters or sons of the kings of each tribe. With this threat, he gained their guarantees of faithfulness and alliance. Based on reports in 2007 of excavations by archaeologists (radio programme of Yves Calvi with researchers in October 2007), the capital of the Arverni is believed to have been situated between Gergovie, Corent, Aulnat and several other significant areas within a  range. Researchers estimate a population of 150,000 inhabitants living in the centre of this area, and a total of more than 400,000 inhabitants living in the region of these towns.

The Arverni were one of the most powerful and wealthy tribes in ancient Gaul:
 They were protected by their location in a mountainous area, which provided strong defenses from outside attackers (for example the Cebenna described by Caesar)
 They had resources: numerous mines of gold, silver and other precious metals (exploited at least since 400 BC)
 The uplands had pastures available for grazing of cattle and sheep herds 
 Their artisans mastered metalworking and complex craftwork (in Julius Caesar's book on the Gallic Wars), Vercingetorix is described with "a big armor made of many assembled silver pieces, reflecting the sun", and in particular copperwork
 They minted their own money, and had strong trade with nearby tribes
 They had ceramic manufacture (workshops in Lezoux, etc.)
 They had influence on nearby tribes and were able to rally the Aedui during the revolt of Vercingetorix.

A shrine in Auvergne marks the Battle of Gergovia. Vercingetorix beat Julius Caesar at Gergovia in 52 BC before he started chasing Caesar's troops.

Roman troops won a victory in Alesia (Alise-sainte-Reine) in Burgundy. Roman legionaries had set traps and established over several hundred metres. They captured Vercingetorix and took him to Rome, where he was imprisoned. Augustonemetum (as Clermont was known) was developed, probably by displacing a  settlement of the Arverni. In the 5th century, Sidonius Apollinaris, an Arvernian nobleman and first bishop of Clermont, made a statement about the end of the Roman age of the Auvergne.

Feudal Auvergne 
In the 7th century, the Franks and the Aquitani competed for control of the Auvergne. Conquered by the Carolingians, it was integrated for a certain time into the kingdom of Aquitania. A section known as the county of Aurillac was given to the father of Géraud d’Aurillac; this grant was made directly by the king. The counts of Auvergne, the Guilhemides, slowly obtained their independence. In the 10th century, Auvergne was subject to rivalry between the counts of Poitiers and Toulouse.

Under the reign of the Carolingians, the Auvergne included five secondary counties with a particular administrative system (Clermont, Turluron, Brioude, Tallende, Carlat (comitatus Cartladensis)).

During the Middle Age, the county of Auvergne covered the current departments of Puy-de-Dôme, the northern half of Cantal, as well as a small third in the North West of Haute-Loire, with the county of Brioude. The other part of Cantal constituted the direct territory of Aurillac Abbey, and a part of it was indentured to the viscounts of Millau, to form the Carlades.

The Auvergne had gone through a very strict feudal regime, synonym for a dispersion of the political power. The Bishop of Clermont removed his city from the counts’ authority, who, as a result, favoured the nearby city of Montferrand. Later, a usurpation of the power of count lead to the creation, by the legitimate robbed count, of a Dauphiné d’Auvergne, independent from the usurper count.

However the royal power took action in the area rather early. Philippe Auguste linked the biggest part of the county to the royal territory. The royal territory of Auvergne took Riom as an administrative center. Staying in the bosom of the Capetian family, the Auvergne is given as appanage to Alphonse, Count of Poitiers, and then in 1360 as a duchy to John, Duke of Berry, who also bought the area of Carlades. His daughter Marie married  John I, Duke of Bourbon, who in 1416 also became Duke of Auvergne. The Dukes of Bourbon acquired the Dauphiné of Auvergne through marriage, but in the end all their territories were confiscated by Francis I (1527)

Modern times  
One century after the Hundred Years' War, the Auvergne was plunged into religious wars. Some Calvinist militia made incursions into the highlands and took castles and Catholic villages by surprise. They returned them, subject to a ransom. Captain Merle in particular, firmly established in nearby Gévaudan, took a ransom from Issoire but failed in Saint Flour. That is how the city of Aurillac had been taken over, and its abbey was completely destroyed.

Around 1200, King Philip August, had not been able to fully defeat the area: the Count held out in Vic-le-Comte. In the 16th century, Catherine de' Medici, Queen of France, inherited the last part of the county from her mother, which allowed the integration of the last feudal fiefdom, in the heart of Auvergne, into the royal territory.

In 1665, Louis XIV temporarily set up an exceptional criminal court in Clermont and Le Puy-en-Velay, les grands jours d’Auvergne (The Great Days of Auvergne), in response to the complaints of the people, who were victims of violence and abuse by officials and noblemen of Auvergne. During the 18th century, the economic situation of the farmers improved considerably, due to the policies of the Auvergne intendants, who developed farming, cheese manufacturing, agriculture, glasswork, ironwork and roads.

During World War II, Vichy was the headquarters of the government of the French State.

Demographics
Auvergne is an underpopulated area with an aging population. Auvergne is one of the least populated regions in Europe, and lies at the heart of the empty diagonal, a swath of sparsely populated territory running from northeastern to southwestern France.

The main communes in Auvergne are (2019 census, municipal population): Clermont-Ferrand (147,865), Montluçon (34,361), Aurillac (25,593), and Vichy (24,980).

Major communities

 Aurillac
 Chamalières
 Clermont-Ferrand
 Cournon-d'Auvergne
 Issoire
 Le Puy-en-Velay
 Montluçon
 Moulins, Allier
 Riom
 Vichy
 Thiers, Puy-de-Dôme

Economy
The region is predominantly agricultural, with tourism slowly growing. Both beef and dairy cattle are plentiful, and there are several  well-known cheeses: Bleu d'Auvergne, Cantal, Fourme d'Ambert and Saint-Nectaire.

Despite its small local market, the Auvergne region has developed many national and international companies, such as Michelin, Limagrain (seed), the Centre France-La Montagne group (regional daily press), Volvic mineral water (Danone group) and numerous dynamic SMEs around the two universities and high schools (engineering, medical and business) of its capital, Clermont-Ferrand.

Most of these companies export more than 75% of their production.

Auvergne is also a relatively industrial region: the share of the working population in industry is 22% (110,000 jobs), compared to the national average of 18%. The main industry is the tyre industry, represented by Michelin, with headquarters and history is located in Clermont-Ferrand, and Dunlop, based in Montluçon. There is also a diverse range of small industries, particularly in the Puy-de-Dôme and the Haute-Loire: metallurgical (Aubert and Duval), mechanical, pharmaceutical (Merck-Chibret), food—cereals; meat (Salers, Limousin)—as well as cheese.

These include Thiers cutlery, metal Issoire, lace in Le Puy, and livestock as well as food in the Cantal.

The Auvergne is one of the premier research areas in France with more than 8,000 researchers in the fields of chemistry, tires, steel, medical and pharmaceutical sciences in agricultural research (INRA and Limagrain laboratories), in biotechnology, seismology and meteorology.

The food industry, with its branches mineral water, dairy products, meat products, forestry, honey, jams and candied fruit, employs over 12,000 people.

In 2018, the animal theme park Le Pal had 640,000 visitors, making it the most visited theme park in Auvergne-Rhône-Alpes. Le Pal is the fifth most visited amusement park in France and the fourth in the zoo sector.

In popular culture
 Clark Ashton Smith's  stories are set in a fictionalised version of medieval Auvergne.
 The 2002 film To Be and to Have documents one year in the life of a one-teacher school in rural .
  is a collection of folk songs from the Auvergne region arranged by Joseph Canteloube for soprano solo and orchestra in five series beginning in the 1920s. The original setting uses Auvergnat, the Occitan dialect of the region, but also has been written in modern French.
 Rhapsodie d'Auvergne, Op. 73, is a concerted work for piano and orchestra by Camille Saint-Saëns (1884). It includes a melody that the composer heard while traveling in the region.
 The first verse of Georges Brassens' song "Chanson pour l'Auvergnat" about an Auvergne inhabitant who was the only one to give the hungered protagonist wood so he could warm himself up. (1954)

References

External links
 Auvergne : at the heart of nature - The official website of France (in English)
 Auvergne regional council website 

  
 Auvergne Web Tourist and general information about the Auvergne region. 
 Regordane Info Independent portal for the Regordane Way or St Gilles Trail. The Regordane Way starts in Auvergne 
 Auvergne-tourism 

 

Massif Central
NUTS 2 statistical regions of the European Union
Former regions of France